Gaëtan Hendrickx (born 30 March 1995) is a Belgian professional footballer who plays as a midfielder for Deinze.

He is the younger brother of fellow professional footballer Jonathan Hendrickx.

Club career
On 14 August 2021, he signed a contract with Deinze for the term of two years with an option for the third.

References

External links

1995 births
Living people
Belgian footballers
Belgium youth international footballers
People from Braine-l'Alleud
Footballers from Walloon Brabant
Association football midfielders
Sint-Truidense V.V. players
R. Charleroi S.C. players
K.V. Kortrijk players
K.M.S.K. Deinze players
Belgian Pro League players
Challenger Pro League players